Pfäffikon may refer to:

Pfäffikon District, Canton of Zürich, Switzerland 
Pfäffikon, Zürich (Pfäffikon ZH), a municipality and capital of the district
Pfäffikon, Schwyz (Pfäffikon SZ), a town within the municipality of Freienbach, Canton of Schwyz, Switzerland

See also
Pfeffikon (Pfeffikon LU), a municipality in the canton of Lucerne, Switzerland